Class 484 may refer to:

British Rail Class 484
DBAG Class 483 and 484
SB Cargo TRAXX class Re484 locomotives